The 2002–03 Powergen Cup was the 32nd edition of England's rugby union club competition. Gloucester won the competition defeating Northampton Saints in the final. The event was sponsored by Powergen and the final was held at Twickenham Stadium.

Draw and results

First round

Second round

Third round

Fourth round

Fifth round

Sixth round

Quarter-finals

Semi-finals

Final

References

2002–03 rugby union tournaments for clubs
2002–03 in English rugby union
2002-03